Tibshelf & Newton railway station was on the Midland Railway's line from Westhouses in Derbyshire to . The line opened in 1883, following the opening of Pleasley Colliery in 1878. It closed to passengers in 1930.

References

Bibliography

Disused railway stations in Derbyshire
Former Midland Railway stations
Railway stations in Great Britain opened in 1886
Railway stations in Great Britain closed in 1930
1886 establishments in England
1930 disestablishments in England